In chemistry, pentadiene is any hydrocarbon with an open chain of five carbons, connected by two single bonds and two double bonds.  All those compounds have the same molecular formula .  Specifically, it may be
 1,2-pentadiene, or ethyl allene, =C=CH––.
 1,3-pentadiene,  =CH–CH=CH- with two isomers:
 cis-1,3-pentadiene.
 trans-1,3-pentadiene, or piperylene.
 1,4-pentadiene, =CH––CH=.
 2,3-pentadiene, –CH=C=CH–, with two enantiomers (R and S).

See also
 Allene
 Pentene
 Pentane
 Hexadiene
 Butadiene
 Cyclopentadiene

References

Alkadienes